F.R.U.I.T.S. are a Moscow-based cult duo comprising Alexei Borisov and Pavel Zhagun. The duo was formed in 1992 to combine different directions of experimental music, such as abstract electronica, noise music, rhythmical, minimalism, micro and macro sounds and waves, and free improvised voices.

Their release "Forbidden Beat" (from their latest album Laton) has been said by some to represent F.R.U.I.T.S. at the peak of their creativity, with a combination of a bass-heavy danceable electro, drum 'n' noise, futuristic soundcapes, dark voice work outs and absurd humour refraining. 

Borisov and Jagun are both legends of the Russian underground music scene and are well known for their various projects since the early 1980s. Borisov was and still is the driving force behind many Russian new wave, industrial, electronica bands such as Tsentr, Nochnoi Prospekt and Volga in addition to his mostly experimental electronic solo-projects. Jagun is a well-known Russian composer, electronic specialist and professionally educated brass player. Since the middle of the 1980s he has produced different electronic projects including the most famous alternative rock formation of ex-Soviet Union, Moralnyi Kodeks. During the 70-80s he played in the USSR's most popular touring pop bands. In Russia he is also very famous as a successful songwriter for chart-topping pop acts and author of many pop and rock hits, for example "Vstretscha na Elbe" by Meantraitors or "Matrosskaja tischina" by Spinglett.

External links
https://web.archive.org/web/20060624034415/http://laton.at/artists/fruits.html

Russian musical groups